Ju Se-jong (born 30 October 1990) is a South Korean football player who plays as a midfielder for K League 2 club Daejeon Hana Citizen.

Club career

Busan IPark
Ju made his league debut for Busan IPark as a substitute in 6–0 defeat away to FC Seoul on 21 July 2012. His first full start came almost two years later in a league match against Gyeongnam on 4 May 2014. Ju scored his first goal for the club in an FA Cup game against Suwon City on 16 July 2014, which IPark went on to win 3–2 after extra time. His first league goal came a month later in a 4–2 victory over Seongnam FC. Ju became a regular starter and key player for IPark in the second half of the 2014 K League 1 season. He finished the season with five assists, the most at the club, and was named in the weekly K League 1 'Best Eleven' on three occasions.

Ju continued to be a regular starter in the 2015 season, as IPark were relegated into the K League 2.

FC Seoul
Ju joined FC Seoul on 8 January 2016. On 2nd January 2021 Se-Jong was released following his contract running out.

International career

Ju made his debut for the Korean national team on 11 June 2015, appearing as a substitute in a 3–0 victory over UAE. He was later selected in the squad for the East Asian Cup. He made one appearance, starting in the 1–1 draw with Japan, as Korea won the tournament. Ju's first international goal came in a 6-1 friendly defeat against Spain on 1 June 2016.

In May 2018 he was named in South Korea's preliminary 28 man squad for the 2018 FIFA World Cup in Russia. Ju started in Korea's second group game, a 2-1 defeat to Mexico, and appeared as a substitute in the final group game against Germany. In the sixth minute of injury time, Ju dispossessed Germany goalkeeper Manuel Neuer inside Korea's half and launched a 75-yard ball forward, which Son Heung-min converted to ensure a famous victory for Korea. Ju's assist was recorded as the second longest in World Cup history, behind Manuel Neuer himself, whose assist for Miroslav Klose against England in 2010 measured at 85-90 yards.

Career statistics

Club

International goals
As of match played 1 June 2016. South Korea score listed first, score column indicates score after each Ju Se-jong goal.

Honours

Club
FC Seoul
K League 1: 2016
Asan Mugunghwa
K League 2: 2018

International
South Korea
 EAFF East Asian Cup: 2015, 2017, 2019

References

External links

Ju Se-jong – National Team stats at KFA 

1990 births
Living people
People from Anyang, Gyeonggi
South Korean footballers
Association football midfielders
K League 1 players
K League 2 players
Busan IPark players
FC Seoul players
Gamba Osaka players
Asan Mugunghwa FC players
2018 FIFA World Cup players
South Korea international footballers
2019 AFC Asian Cup players
Sportspeople from Gyeonggi Province